The United States competed at the 1976 World Championships in Athletics in Malmö, Sweden, on September 18,  1976. The championships consisted of one event the men's 50 kilometres walk. The USA entered 3 athletes two of whom finished and none won a medal.

Results

References

Nations at the 1976 World Championships in Athletics
World Championships in Athletics
1976